The 2006 Fareham Council election took place on 4 May 2006 to elect members of Fareham Borough Council in Hampshire, England. Half of the council was up for election and the Conservative Party stayed in overall control of the council.

After the election, the composition of the council was:
Conservative 22
Liberal Democrat 9

Election result
The results saw the Conservatives keep control of the council, after the party defended all the seats they had been holding. The Liberal Democrats held the 6 seats they had been defending, while Labour failed to win any seats with their vote share dropping to 8%. This meant the Conservatives had 22 seats, compared to 9 for the Liberal Democrats. The first British National Party candidate standing in Fareham finished with more votes than either of the Labour candidates in Portchester East and said the party would contest more seats at the next election. Overall turnout in the election was 40.86%, similar to the turnout in 2004.

Ward results

Fareham East

Fareham North

Fareham North West

Fareham South

Fareham West

Hill Head

Locks Heath

Park Gate

Portchester East

Portchester West

Sarisbury

Stubbington

Titchfield

Titchfield Common

Warsash

References

2006
2006 English local elections
2000s in Hampshire